Hemphill is a surname originating from Scotland and is synonymous with similar names such as Hempel and Hemmel.  As a Scottish clan, the Hemphills were considered a border clan, those clans geographically situated closest to Scotland's border with England.  The Hemphill clan identifies itself with the Cunningham tartan. Notable people with the surname include:

Alexander Hemphill (1921–1986), American lawyer and politician
Arlo Hemphill (born 1971), American wilderness advocate, marine biologist, oceanographer, conservationist, naturalist, and actor
Barbara Hemphill (died 1858), Irish novelist
Bret Hemphill (born 1971), American baseball player and coach
Brian Hemphill (born ?), American academic administrator, researcher, author, and college president
Bruce Hemphill (born 1963), South African businessman
Charles Hemphill, 1st Baron Hemphill (1822–1908), Irish baron, politician, and businessman
Charlie Hemphill (1876–1953), American baseball player; brother of Frank Hemphill
C. Scott Hemphill (born ?), American legal academic and law professor
Darryl Hemphill (born 1960), American football player
Doug Hemphill (born ?), American film audio engineer
Essex Hemphill (1957–1995) American poet, writer, and activist
Fitzroy Hemphill, 3rd Baron Hemphill (1860–1930), British baron and politician
Frank Hemphill (1878–1950), American baseball player; brother of Charlie Hemphill
George Hemphill (born 1951), American art dealer and curator
Greg Hemphill (born 1970), Scottish comedian, actor, writer, and director
Helen Hemphill (born 1955), American children’s literature author
Henry Hemphill (1830–1914), American malacologist and conchologist
Herbert Waide Hemphill, Jr. (1929–1998), American folk art collector, curator, and philanthropist
Jacob Hemphill (born ?), American guitarist and vocalist for the band SOJA
Jessie Mae Hemphill (1923–2006), American electric guitarist, songwriter, and vocalist
Jim Hemphill (born 1971), American filmmaker, film historian, and writer
John Hemphill (disambiguation), several people
Joseph Hemphill, (1770–1842), American politician and lawyer
Julius Hemphill (1938–1995), American jazz composer and saxophone player
LaBreeska Hemphill (1940–2015), American Southern gospel performer and author
Mark W. Hemphill (born ?), American railroad dispatcher and consultant, magazine editor, and historian
Maureen Hemphill (born 1937), Canadian politician
Meg Hemphill (born 1996), Japanese track and field athlete
Patrick Martyn-Hemphill, 5th Baron Hemphill (1928–2012), British baron
Paul Hemphill (1936–2009), American journalist and author
Phebe Hemphill (born 1960), American sculptor
Phillip Hemphill ( 1834), American soldier and co-founder of the city of Rome, Georgia
Robert W. Hemphill (1915–1983), American politician, judge, and US Air Force pilot
Ryan Hemphill (born 1981), American race car driver
Samuel Hemphill (1859–1927), Irish Anglican priest
Shelton Hemphill (1906–1960), American jazz trumpeter
Shirley Hemphill (1947–1999), American stand-up comedian and actress
Sid Hemphill (1876–1963), American blues multi-instrumentalist and bandleader
Stephanie Hemphill (born ?), American young adult author and poet
Tahir Hemphill (born 1972), American multimedia artist, ethnolinguist, and design researcher
William Hemphill (1842–1902), American businessman, politician, and Confederate Army colonel